Sundaram Ramesh is an engineer at California State University, Northridge, California. He was named a Fellow of the Institute of Electrical and Electronics Engineers (IEEE) in 2015 for his contributions to entrepreneurship in engineering education.

References

Fellow Members of the IEEE
Living people
Year of birth missing (living people)
Place of birth missing (living people)
California State University, Northridge faculty
American electrical engineers